The Rawlinson and Bosworth Professorship of Anglo-Saxon, until 1916 known as the Rawlinsonian Professorship of Anglo-Saxon, was established by Richard Rawlinson of St John's College, Oxford, in 1795. The Chair is associated with Pembroke College. "Bosworth" was added to commemorate Joseph Bosworth.

Rawlinsonian Professors of Anglo-Saxon

Rawlinson and Bosworth Professors of Anglo-Saxon

See also 
 List of professorships at the University of Oxford

Sources 
 The Historical Register of the University of Oxford. Oxford: Clarendon Press, 1888

J. R. R. Tolkien
Anglo-Saxon, Rawlinson and Bosworth
Anglo-Saxon, Rawlinson and Bosworth
1795 establishments in England
Lists of people associated with the University of Oxford
Pembroke College, Oxford